Bard Rasun-e Olya (also Romanized as Bard Rāsūn-e ‘Olyā) is a village in Tayebi-ye Sarhadi-ye Gharbi Rural District, Charusa District, Kohgiluyeh County, Kohgiluyeh and Boyer-Ahmad Province, Iran. At the 2006 census, its population was 135, in 25 families.

References 

Populated places in Kohgiluyeh County